Vadym Hrabovoyy (born April 5, 1973) is a retired male hammer thrower from Ukraine. He set his personal best (79.82 metres) on May 15, 2002 at a meet in Bila Tserkva.

Achievements

References

hammerthrow.wz

1973 births
Living people
Ukrainian male hammer throwers